Haccho-zeki is an earthfill dam located in Chiba Prefecture in Japan. The dam is used for irrigation.  The dam impounds about 2  ha of land when full and can store 151 thousand cubic meters of water. The construction of the dam was completed in 1933.

References

Dams in Chiba Prefecture
1933 establishments in Japan